Branimir Petrović (born 26 June 1982) is a Serbian football coach and a former midfielder. He is an assistant coach with Russian club Khimki.

Playing career
He was part of the Serbia and Montenegro team at the 2004 Summer Olympics, where they exited in the first round, finishing last in Group C behind gold-medal winners Argentina, Australia and Tunisia. He made two appearances.

Coaching career
On 3 September 2022, Petrović was hired as an assistant manager by Russian Premier League club Khimki. He is assisting Spartak Gogniyev, who was previously his teammate as a player at KAMAZ and Ural.

References

External links

 Russian Premier League profile
 

1982 births
Sportspeople from Užice
Living people
Serbian footballers
Serbia and Montenegro under-21 international footballers
Association football midfielders
FK Sloboda Užice players
FK Zeta players
FK Partizan players
Shandong Taishan F.C. players
FC KAMAZ Naberezhnye Chelny players
FC Rubin Kazan players
FC Rostov players
PFC Krylia Sovetov Samara players
FC Ural Yekaterinburg players
K.V. Kortrijk players
FC Volgar Astrakhan players
FK Napredak Kruševac players
Serbian SuperLiga players
Chinese Super League players
Russian First League players
Russian Premier League players
Belgian Pro League players
Footballers at the 2004 Summer Olympics
Olympic footballers of Serbia and Montenegro
Serbian expatriate footballers
Expatriate footballers in China
Serbian expatriate sportspeople in China
Expatriate footballers in Russia
Serbian expatriate sportspeople in Russia
Expatriate footballers in Belgium
Serbian expatriate sportspeople in Belgium
Serbian expatriate football managers
Expatriate football managers in Russia